Bumpus Mills is an unincorporated community in Stewart County, Tennessee, United States.

Further reading
Stewart County Heritage, Volume One, Taylor Publishing, Library of Congress Catalog Card Number 80-54540.

Notes

External links
Stewart County Chamber of Commerce

Unincorporated communities in Tennessee
Unincorporated communities in Stewart County, Tennessee
Clarksville metropolitan area